George Cram may refer to:
 George F. Cram (1842–1928), American map publisher
 George Henry Cram (1838–1872), American Civil War Union Army brevet general